Thomas F. Schweigert (September 29, 1917 – July 9, 2001) was an American politician who served as a member of the Michigan Senate and as acting lieutenant governor of Michigan.

Early life and education 
Born in Detroit, Michigan, Schweigert attended Highland Park Community High School. He graduated from Michigan State University with a degree in forestry.

Career 
Schweigert began his career United States Forest Service before founding a private forestry management company. He served in the United States Army during World War II.

He served on the Emmet County, Michigan Board of Commissioners. Schweigert then served in the Michigan State Senate from 1961 to 1971 as a Republican. Schweigert was President of the Michigan Senate and acting lieutenant governor of Michigan in 1969, serving under Governor William G. Milliken.

Personal life 
Schweigert and his wife, Peggy, had three children. He was a member of the Church of Christ, Scientist. Schweigert died in Petoskey, Michigan.

References

1917 births
2001 deaths
Politicians from Detroit
People from Petoskey, Michigan
Military personnel from Detroit
American foresters
American Christian Scientists
Businesspeople from Michigan
Michigan State University alumni
County commissioners in Michigan
Republican Party Michigan state senators
Lieutenant Governors of Michigan
20th-century American politicians
20th-century American businesspeople